Alamo Lake State Park is a state park of Arizona, USA, centered on Alamo Lake, a flood control and recreational reservoir. It is accessed via a paved two-lane road off either U.S. Route 60 to the south or U.S. Route 93 to the east. Owing to its remoteness, the park is often considered one of the "best kept secrets" of the state park system.

Alamo Lake State Park features camping facilities and attracts wildlife enthusiasts, as the park is home to numerous wildlife species including the bald eagle. The park's remoteness and distance from cities also makes it a destination for stargazing, as it is the darkest sky state park in Arizona.

Alamo Lake
Alamo Lake itself is formed by the Alamo Dam that is part of the Alamo Lake State Park administered by the Arizona State Parks. The lake impounds runoff from the Bill Williams River, an intermittent tributary of the Colorado River. The dam was constructed in 1968 by the Army Corps of Engineers, primarily for flood control purposes. The dam is an earthfill dam that rises  from the streambed.

While the Bill Williams River is often dry, heavy seasonal rains maintain the lake's depth. During extreme flood events, the reservoir can fill rapidly; the lake has been recorded to rise  in a single night due to extreme flooding.

Unusually high flows during the 1970s and 1980s increased the depth and size of the reservoir to unexpected levels, giving birth to recreational and fishing possibilities. Since then, the lake has been stocked with numerous fish species, including largemouth bass, crappie, sunfish, channel catfish, flathead catfish and tilapia. The lake is host to fishing tournaments and has been the location of at least one Arizona state fishing record.

The park can be accessed by a paved road from Highway 60 at the Wenden turn-off to the north on Alamo Lake Road.

References

External links

Arizonan.com Article
Arizona Boating Locations Facilities Map
Arizona Fishing Locations Map

1969 establishments in Arizona
Dams completed in 1968
Dams in Arizona
Parks in La Paz County, Arizona
Protected areas established in 1969
Reservoirs in La Paz County, Arizona
Reservoirs in Mohave County, Arizona
State parks of Arizona
United States Army Corps of Engineers dams
Reservoirs in Arizona